The Commander of the Joint Headquarters is Chief of the Latvian National Armed Forces and the national defence organisations.

List of Chiefs

Armed Forces Commander (1919–1940)

For period from 1940 to 1992, see Chief of the General Staff.

Commander of the Joint Headquarters (1992–present)

See also
 Latvian National Armed Forces

References

Military of Latvia
Latvia